Bronwyn Mary Hayward  is a New Zealand political scientist. Her areas of research are democracy, sustainability and young people. She was a lead author on a United Nations' Intergovernmental Panel on Climate Change Special Report.

Biography 
Hayward was born and raised in Christchurch, New Zealand. She attended Christchurch Girls' High School and then moved to Dunedin to study at the University of Otago. She completed bachelor's, master's and doctorate degrees in political science and geography at Otago.

Hayward has been Senior Visiting Fellow with the Sustainable Lives Research Group (University of Surrey) and from 2008 to 2011 was a visiting fellow at the Tyndall Centre for climate change research in East Anglia. She was a co-researcher at the University of Oslo on the Voices of the Future project, a study of young people growing up in a changing climate. She is also a Co-Primary Investigator for the Centre for the Understanding of Sustainable Prosperity, University of Surrey, UK (2016-2020).

Hayward is a professor in the Department of Political Science and International Relations at the University of Canterbury. She is also director of the university's Sustainable Citizenship and Civic Imagination: Hei Puāwaitanga research group.

Hayward is considered a world expert on sustainability and youth politics. She was a lead author on UN's Intergovernmental Panel on Climate Change Special Report on the impacts of global warming of 1.5 °C. In the 2021 New Year Honours, Hayward was appointed a Member of the New Zealand Order of Merit, for services to political science, particularly sustainability, climate change and youth.

Bibliography 

 Hayward BM. (2017) Sea Change: Climate Politics and New Zealand. BWB Bridget Williams Books. 120. http://dx.doi.org/10.7810/9781988533285.
 Hayward B. (2012) Children, citizenship and environment: Nurturing a democratic imagination in a changing world.1–190. 10.4324/9780203106839.
 Hayward BM., Collins R. and Nissen SE. (2017) Children and Environment. In Demeritt D; Castree N; Richardson D (Ed.), International Encyclopaedia of Geography: People, the Earth, Environment and Technology: 7. London: Wiley. http://dx.doi.org/10.1002/9781118786352.wbieg0371.
 Hayward B., Collins R. and Nissen S. (2016) Children and Environment. In Demeritt D; Castree N; Richardson D (Ed.), The International Encyclopaedia of Geography: forthcoming. London: Wiley.
 Nissen SE. and Hayward BM. (2016) Student associations: The New Zealand experience. In Brooks R (Ed.), Student Politics and Protest: International perspectives: 129–142.Routledge.

References

External links
University of Canterbury Research Profile for Bronwyn Hayward
Centre for the Understanding of Sustainable Prosperity

Living people
Year of birth missing (living people)
People from Christchurch
Academic staff of the University of Canterbury
University of Otago alumni
People educated at Riccarton High School
New Zealand political scientists
Women political scientists
Members of the New Zealand Order of Merit
New Zealand Women of Influence Award recipients